Columbia-Montour Area Vocational-Technical School is located in Bloomsburg, Pennsylvania, United States. It is a full-time area vocational-technical school that serves the youth of Columbia and Montour counties in Pennsylvania. CMAVTS offers 17 training areas to secondary students in grades 9 through 12. In ninth grade, students are put through an exploratory program where they go through four programs through the course of a school year. In tenth grade they choose their "major" to focus on, up until graduation in 12th grade. According to the National Center for Education Statistics, in 2010, the school reported an enrollment of 633 pupils. The school employed 43.5 teachers yielding a student teacher ratio of 14:1.

The school is an extension of the educational programs of the seven participating school districts. The option of vocational education at the Columbia-Montour AVTS gives students a full range of educational choices. In addition to the traditional high school student, they also offer education options to adults with evening and summers with their adult education classes.

Participating School Districts
Benton Area School District
Berwick Area School District
Bloomsburg Area School District
Central Columbia School District
Danville Area School District
Millville Area School District
Southern Columbia Area School District

The school is governed by a board that is composed of one member of each of its participating districts. These individuals are appointed from the respective District's school board.

Extracurriculars
Columbia-Montour AVTS offers a variety of clubs, activities and sports. Columbia-Montour AVTS has a Cooperative Agreement with Columbia-County Christian Academy, for all sports except the following: soccer, boys and girls basketball, and cheerleading.

Sports
The District funds:

Boys
Baseball - AAA
Basketball -AAA
Bowling - AAAA
Cross Country - AA
Football - AAA
 Wrestling	 - AA

Girls
Basketball - AA
Bowling - AAAA
Cheerleading
Soccer (Fall) - A
Softball - AA

Clubs
National Honor Society (NHS)
School Newspaper (RamPage)
Students Against Drunk Driving (SADD)
Envirothon
Varsity Club
Yearbook
Skills USA (VICA)
An Association of Marketing Students (DECA)
Health Occupations Students of America (HOSA)
Family, Career and Community Leaders of America (FCCLA)
An Association of Agriculture Education Students (FFA)

References

External links
Official site

Educational institutions established in 1969
Schools in Columbia County, Pennsylvania
Public high schools in Pennsylvania
1969 establishments in Pennsylvania